Chinese Taipei first competed at the Asian Games in 1954.

Asian Games

Medals by Games

Asian Para Games

Medals by Games

Asian Beach Games

Medals by Games

Asian Indoor and Martial Arts Games

Medals by Games

Asian Youth Games

Medals by Games

Asian Youth Para Games

Medals by Games

East Asian Games

Medals by Games

East Asian Youth Games

Medals by Games

References